
Year 810 (DCCCX) was a common year starting on Tuesday (link will display the full calendar) of the Julian calendar.

Events 
 By place 
 Byzantine Empire 
 Spring – The Venetian dukes change sides again, submitting to King Pepin, under the authority of his father Charlemagne, who then proceeds to take Venice. Emperor Nikephoros I sends a Byzantine fleet to Dalmatia, prompting Pepin to withdraw to the mainland. A legate is dispatched to Venice, where he deposes the turncoat dukes, before continuing on to Aachen, to negotiate a peace with Charlemagne. Charlemagne recognises Byzantine dominance over Venice and Dalmatia in the Adriatic Sea.

 Europe 
 King Godfred of the Danes leads 200 Viking ships to plunder the Frisian coast, and forces the merchants to pay 100 pounds of silver. He claims Northern Frisia as Danish territory.
 Godfred is killed by one of his housecarls, and is succeeded by Hemming. According to Notker of Saint Gall, the bodyguard who murdered Godfred is possibly one of his sons.
 Al-Andalus (modern Spain): The city of Mérida rises up against the Emirate of Córdoba.

 By topic 
 Religion 
 Tikal Temple III, also known as the Temple of the Jaguar Priest, is constructed in Tikal National Park (modern Guatemala).
 The Book of Kells (also known as the Book of Colomba), an illuminated manuscript, is completed by Celtic monks (approximate date).

Births 
 July 19 – Muhammad al-Bukhari, Persian Islamic scholar (d. 870)
 July 27 – Xuān Zong, emperor of the Tang Dynasty (d. 859)
 Abbas ibn Firnas, Muslim physician and inventor (d. 887)
 Anastasius, antipope of Rome (approximate date)
 Bertharius, Benedictine abbot and poet (approximate date)
 Engelram, Frankish chamberlain (approximate date)
 Gérard II, Frankish nobleman (approximate date)
 Halfdan the Black, Norwegian nobleman (approximate date)
 Kassia, Byzantine abbess and hymnographer (approximate date)
 Kenneth MacAlpin, king of Scotland (d. 858) 
 Louis the German, king of East Francia (approximate date)
 Minamoto no Makoto, Japanese prince (d. 868)
 Photius I, patriarch of Constantinople (approximate date) 
 Seishi, empress of Japan (d. 879)

Deaths 
 July 8 – Pippin of Italy, son of Charlemagne
 Æthelburh, Anglo-Saxon abbess
 Abul-Abbas, Asian elephant given to Charlemagne
 Bello of Carcassonne, Frankish nobleman
 Eardwulf, king of Northumbria (approximate date)
 Eochaid mac Fiachnai, king of Ulaid (Ireland)
 Fujiwara no Nakanari, Japanese nobleman (b. 764) 
 Gisela, Frankish abbess (b. 757)
 Godfred, king of the Danes
 Ismail ibn Ibrahim, Muslim scholar (b. 756)
 Liu Ji, general of the Tang Dynasty (b. 757)
 Owain ap Maredudd, king of Dyfed (Wales)
 Rotrude, Frankish princess, daughter of Charlemagne
 Thrasco, Obotrite prince
 Vojnomir, duke of Lower Pannonia (approximate date)
 Wu Shaocheng, general of the Tang Dynasty (b. 750)

References